Ravno do dna is a live album of the Yugoslavian rock band Azra, released through Jugoton in 1982 on triple vinyl. It was recorded in club Kulušić, Zagreb on October 21, 1981.

Ravno do dna has been described as the best live album in the history of Yugoslav rock music. It placed sixth in the list of 100 greatest Yugoslav rock albums, compiled by the Croatian edition of the Rolling Stone magazine in 2015.

Track listing
All music and lyrics written by Branimir Štulić, except track 13 lyrics by Mile Rupčić.

Personnel 
Azra
Branimir Štulić – Guitars, lead vocals
Mišo Hrnjak – Bass
Boris Leiner – Drums

Artwork
Ivan Ivezić – Design
Davor Šarić - Photography

Production
Branimir Štulić – Producer
Siniša Škarica - Executive producer
Mladen Škalec - Sound technician

References

 www.discogs.com

Azra albums
1982 albums
Jugoton albums
Live rock albums